Nürnberg Frankenstadion station is a railway station in Nuremberg, Germany. It is located along the Nuremberg–Feucht railway, between the Zerzabelshof district in the north and Volkspark Dutzendteich in the south. It is served by the S2 of the Nuremberg S-Bahn.

History
The station was built in connection with the construction of the second Nuremberg S-Bahn line (S2) to replace the old Nürnberg-Dutzendteich station. The Deutsche Bundesbahn opened the station on November 22, 1992. Since the capacity of the facilities was often insufficient, especially after events, and dangerous situations repeatedly occurred on the platform, the platform was extended from 145 to 272 meters in 2002 and an additional access was built at the eastern end of the platform. A further upgrade to increase the capacity was carried out after Germany was awarded the 2006 Soccer World Cup, for which Nuremberg was also scheduled to host the event. For this purpose, a special platform was built in the immediate vicinity, but without a direct pedestrian connection to the existing S-Bahn station. The construction costs for this measure, which increased the total transport capacity to and from this station from 7,400 to around 15,200 passengers per hour, amounted to around 8.8 million euros. The special platform started operation on May 13, 2006.

Facilities
It has a 272-meter-long (145 meters prior to the upgrade in 2002) and 96-centimeter-high partially covered island platform on the S-Bahn line and a 342-meter long platform on the Nuremberg-Regensburg railway line that is 76 centimeters high. The latter is located on the track in the direction of Regensburg and has another platform edge with a newly constructed stub track for shuttle trains heading in the direction of the central station. Access is at ground level, while the S-Bahn platform is accessed from the Hans-Kalb-Straße underpass.

Service
The S-Bahn station is served by the S2 line (Roth - Nuremberg - Altdorf). During major events at the Max-Morlock-Stadion or the Arena Nürnberg, the station is also served by the S3 line (Nuremberg - Neumarkt), regional trains (Nuremberg - Parsberg) and special trains, which can only stop at the special platform due to the different floor heights of the cars used. In addition, the station is linked to city bus lines 44, 55 and 96.

Notable places nearby
Frankenstadion (Max-Morlock-Stadion)
Arena Nürnberg (Arena Nürnberger Versicherung)

Gallery

References

Frankenstadion
Frankenstadion
Railway stations in Germany opened in 1992